is a railway station in the city of Shiogama, Miyagi Prefecture, Japan, operated by East Japan Railway Company (JR East).

Lines
Nishi-Shiogama Station is served by the Senseki Line. It is located 15.2 rail kilometers from the terminus of the Senseki Line at Aoba-dōri Station.

Station layout
Nishi-Shiogama Station has two opposed side platforms connected by a footbridge. The station is staffed.

Platforms

History
Nishi-Shiogama Station opened on June 5, 1925 as a station on the Miyagi Electric Railway. The line was nationalized on May 1, 1944. The station was absorbed into the JR East network upon the privatization of JNR on April 1, 1987.

Surrounding area
Shiogama Municipal Hospital
Shiogama Temple
Shiogama Station on the Tōhoku Main Line is within walking distance

See also
 List of Railway Stations in Japan

External links

  

Railway stations in Miyagi Prefecture
Senseki Line
Railway stations in Japan opened in 1925
Stations of East Japan Railway Company
Shiogama, Miyagi